Higher Power is a 2018 science fiction action thriller film directed by Matthew Charles Santoro. It is about an ordinary man faced with the task of saving the world from destruction. It was released on May 11, 2018. It stars Jordan Hinson, Ron Eldard, Colm Feore, Austin Stowell,  Jade Tailor and Tom Wright.

Story
The world is at risk and it's up to one man to save it. A mad scientist has to go through the DNA of the population of earth to find someone to do the job. The needed hero turns out to be a former alcoholic called Joe who has an anger problem and two estranged daughters called Zoe and Rhea. Joe then finds himself in the hands of the mad scientist. The experimental work that the scientist does on Joe equips him with some kind of electromagnetic power that could either save the world or if not, destroy it.

Cast
 Ron Eldard as Joe Steadman 
 Jordan Hinson as Zoe Steadman 
 Austin Stowell as Michael
 Colm Feore as Control
 Jade Tailor as Heather Steadman 
 Winston James Francis as Tele
 Marielle Jaffeas Rhea Steadman 
 Tom Wright as Tom Davis the Talk Show Host
 Mei Melançon as Ms. Sabi
 Laura Margolis as Rebecca
 Richard Portnow as Charles Margrey
 Omar Doom as Dario
 Linc Hand as Officer Smith
 Exie Booker as Rogers
 Tony Nevada as Field Agent 
 Benjamin John Parrillo as Detective 
 Michelle Laine as Drugged-Out Girl 
 Richard Dorton as Field Agent #4 
 David Preston as Jeremy
 Fitz Houston as Frank
 Adam Budron as Actor

Production and release
Director Matthew Charles Santoro had previously worked on Aliens vs. Predator: Requiem, Fantastic Four: Rise of the Silver Surfer and the X-Men films (X-Men Origins: Wolverine and X-Men: The Last Stand), as a visual artist. This film is his directorial debut.

The film opened at Bainbridge Cinemas at the Pavilion Mall in Bainbridge Island, Washington, on May 11, 2018.

References

External links
 
 Fmovie Mag: Higher Power Review
 Malay Mail: Higher Power review by  Aidil Rusli

2018 films
2018 directorial debut films
2018 science fiction films
2018 thriller films
2010s science fiction thriller films
American science fiction thriller films
Di Bonaventura Pictures films
Films produced by Lorenzo di Bonaventura
2010s English-language films
2010s American films